J. Edgar Hoover is a 1987 American biographical drama television film written and directed by Robert L. Collins. It stars Treat Williams as the eponymous J. Edgar Hoover, the long-serving (1924 - 1972) Director of the Federal Bureau of Investigation. The film is based on the 1979 book The Bureau: My 30 Years in Hoover's FBI by William C. Sullivan and William S. Brown, and dramatizes key points in Hoover's life between the time he joined the U.S. Justice Department in 1919 and his death in May 1972. It aired on Showtime on January 11, 1987.

Cast
 Treat Williams - J. Edgar Hoover
 Robert Alan Browne - Gaston Means
 Mark Carlton - 1st Agent
 Andrew Duggan - Dwight D. Eisenhower
 Louise Fletcher - Annie M. Hoover
 Charles Hallahan - Joseph McCarthy
 Art Hindle - John F. Kennedy
 Erik Holland - William J. Burns
 James F. Kelly - Robert F. Kennedy (one of seven appearances as RFK)
 Paul Kent - Harry M. Daugherty
 Lee Kessler - Helen Gandy
 Charles Levin - Producer
 John McLiam - A. Mitchell Palmer
 F.J. O'Neil - Harry Vaughn
 Ford Rainey - Harlan Fiske Stone
 Joe Regalbuto - William C. Sullivan
 David Ogden Stiers - Franklin D. Roosevelt
 William Traylor - Nicholas Katzenbach
 Harvey Vernon - Senator George W. Norris
 Mills Watson - Senator Kenneth McKellar
Anthony Palmer - Richard M. Nixon
 Rip Torn - Lyndon B. Johnson
 Don Draper - Maitre d'
 Paul Keith - Doctor
 Gracia Lee - Annie
 Cliff Murdock - Carl Mathews
 Michael Griswold - Congressman Hale Boggs
 Walker Edmiston - Harry S. Truman
 Robert Harper - Clyde Tolson

External links

1987 television films
1987 films
1987 drama films
1980s biographical drama films
1980s English-language films
American biographical drama films
Biographical television films
American drama television films
Cultural depictions of Dwight D. Eisenhower
Cultural depictions of John F. Kennedy
Cultural depictions of Robert F. Kennedy
Cultural depictions of J. Edgar Hoover
Cultural depictions of Lyndon B. Johnson
Cultural depictions of Richard Nixon
Cultural depictions of Franklin D. Roosevelt
Cultural depictions of Harry S. Truman
Films about the Federal Bureau of Investigation
Films based on biographies
Films directed by Robert L. Collins
Films scored by J. Peter Robinson
Showtime (TV network) films
Television films based on books
1980s American films